Llanquihue River is a river in the commune of Panguipulli, southern Chile. It is formed by the union of Neltume River and Fui River. Llanquihue River flows in a south and westward and outflows in Panguipulli Lake.

References

Rivers of Chile
Rivers of Los Ríos Region